The 2021 Memphis Tigers football team represented the University of Memphis in the 2021 NCAA Division I FBS football season. The Tigers played their home games at Liberty Bowl Memorial Stadium in Memphis, Tennessee, and competed in the American Athletic Conference. They were led by second-year head coach Ryan Silverfield.

The Tigers finished the regular season with a 6–6 record and were due to face the Hawaii Rainbow Warriors in the Hawaii Bowl. However, due to a COVID-19 outbreak, season-ending injuries, and transfers, the Rainbow Warriors were forced to withdraw the day before the game, leaving the Tigers without a bowl game. Silverfield later jokingly declared Memphis as “Hawaii Bowl champions”.

Previous season

The Tigers finished the 2020 season 8–3, 5–3 in AAC play to finish third in the conference. They won the Montgomery Bowl 25–10 against Florida Atlantic.

Preseason

American Athletic Conference preseason media poll
The American Athletic Conference preseason media poll was released at the virtual media day held August 4, 2021. Cincinnati, who finished the 2020 season ranked No. 8 nationally, was tabbed as the preseason favorite in the 2021 preseason media poll.

Schedule

  Hawaii was forced to withdraw due to COVID-19 and other related issues within the team. The game was canceled shortly after.

Game summaries

Nicholls

at Arkansas State

Mississippi State

UTSA

at Temple

at Tulsa

Navy

at UCF

SMU

East Carolina

at No. 24 Houston

Tulane

Rankings

References

Memphis
Memphis Tigers football seasons
Memphis Tigers football